Disueri Lake is a lake in the Province of Caltanissetta, Sicily, Italy.

Lakes of Sicily